The Woodentops is a children's television series first shown on BBC Television in 1955. Created by Freda Lingstrom and Maria Bird, it featured on the Friday edition of Watch with Mother and regularly repeated until 1973. The main characters are the members of a family living on a farm. The aim of the programme was to teach pre-school children about family life.

Puppet characters 

Daddy Woodentop
Mummy Woodentop
Jenny Woodentop
Willy Woodentop
Baby Woodentop
Spotty Dog ("the very biggest spotty dog you ever did see")
The children, Jenny and Willy, were twins. They spoke, walked and did many things together.

Other characters included:
Mrs Scrubbitt (who comes to "help" Mrs Woodentop)
Sam Scrubbitt (who helps Daddy Woodentop with the animals)
Buttercup the Cow

Cast 
Scripts and music: Maria Bird
Puppeteers: Audrey Atterbury, Molly Gibson and Gordon Murray
Voices: Eileen Browne, Josephina Ray, Peter Hawkins
Designs: Barbara Jones

Episodes 
 Introduction (9 September 1955)
 Boats and Pigs
 Horse
 Spotty's Paw
 Spotty's Sheep
 Spotty's Joke
 Dog Washing
 Injured Bird
 Bird Set Free
 Twins' Holiday
 Soap Box
 Baby's Bath
 Surprises
 Show
 Party
 Buttercup
 Belling the Cow
 Hayfield
 Horse Shoe (14 March 1958)
 Steam Roller
 Geese
 Ducks
 Pram
 Dinner Bell
 Sacks
 Paper Hats

Production 
The Woodentops was filmed in a tin shed at the BBC's Lime Grove Studios. The narrator/storyteller for all episodes, who also provided the dialogue for Mummy Woodentop, was Maria Bird who spoke with Received Pronunciation, as was typical of BBC presenters of the time. Daddy Woodentop, being a farmer, spoke with a noticeable West Country accent.
 
Although set on a farm, at an unspecified location, each episode began with the whole family being introduced as they sat in front of a tall curtain, apparently on a stage. Episodes closed with the family grouped in the same pose, with the word "GOODBYE" superimposed above.

The music at the beginning and end of each story is taken from the 22nd piece of the set of 25 Norwegian folk songs and dances for piano, Opus 17 by Edvard Grieg. This music, which is quite short in duration, is called , which translates to "Cattle-Call". It is divided into two sections, the first of which is used for the introduction and the second part for the end of each story. It occasionally appears as a leitmotif in the stories, hummed by Mummy Woodentop from time to time.

In 1983, the original puppets were stolen from the BBC. They were spotted a year later in an auction room in London and returned. The puppets are now in the Museum of London's permanent collection.

The Official BBC Children in Need Medley
In 2009, The Woodentops appeared in The Official BBC Children in Need Medley music video which reached No.1 in the UK Singles Chart. Daddy and Mummy Woodentop appeared in the video; Jenny appears on the front cover of the CD and DVD but not in the music video.

References

External links
More information

BBC children's television shows
British preschool education television series
British television shows featuring puppetry
1950s preschool education television series
1955 British television series debuts
1950s British children's television series
Television series about families